Rodiyah binti Sapiee (born 4 November 1978) is a Malaysian politician and engineer who is the Member of Parliament (MP) for Batang Sadong since November 2022.

Rodiyah started her career as a lecturer at the Sarawak Skills and Development Centre in 2000. She then became a civil engineer and project manager from 2001 to 2004. Before becoming an MP, she was the manager of the Risk Management Unit at LCDA Holdings Sdn. Bhd.

Election results

References

External links 

1978 births
Living people
21st-century engineers
21st-century Malaysian politicians
Malaysian civil engineers
Malaysian Muslims
Members of the Dewan Rakyat
Parti Pesaka Bumiputera Bersatu politicians
Women in Sarawak politics
Women members of the Dewan Rakyat
21st-century Malaysian women politicians